"Good Days" is a 2020 song by SZA.

Good Days may also refer to:

 "Good Days", a 2018 song by Keshi
 "Good Days", a 2021 song by Now United and the Bootcampers
 "Good Days", a song by the Cairos from the 2014 album Dream of Reason
 "Good Days", a song by Young Rising Sons from the 2022 album Still Point in a Turning World
 Good Days, a 2020 album by the Chicago Underground Quartet

See also
 
 
 Good Day (disambiguation)
 Good Old Days (disambiguation)